Bobby & Laurie were an Australian beat pop duo of the 1960s, with Laurie Allen (19422002) on vocals, guitar and keyboards and Bobby Bright (born in England, 3 February 1945) on vocals and guitar. Their regular backing band were the Rondells. The duo's most popular singles were, "I Belong with You" (1964) and "Hitch Hiker" (1966). Their debut album, Bobby and Laurie (1965), was the first for independent label, Go!! Records. The duo disbanded in 1967 to pursue solo careers and briefly reformed from 1969 to 1971. Laurie Allen died in 2002, aged 60, after a heart attack.

History 

Lawrence Frank Allen was born in Melbourne on 9 March 1942 to Jack and Edna Laurie. On vocals and guitar Allen formed the Three Jays, in the late 1950s, with Jimmy Braggs on piano accordion and Johnny MacGaw on drums. He followed with stints in the Lories (c. 1958) and then the Roulettes (1958–59), a long-running Melbourne revue band. From 1959 to 1961, he was lead guitarist for Malcolm Arthur & the Knights, and in 1962 he was lead singer and organist of a previously instrumental group, the Blue Jays. At the end of 1963, the Blue Jays became the Fabulous Blue Jays, the backing band for singer, Tony Worsley. Allen then rejoined the Roulettes.

Bobby Bright born on 3 February 1945 in England. He worked as a solo artist in Adelaide. He moved to Melbourne and released two singles on the W&G Records label in 1963, "Girls Never Notice Me" (with the Strangers) and "Defeated by His Heart", before joining the Roulettes later in that year.

Another member of the Roulettes was Ron Blackmore who moved into band management. Allen and Bright that group and performed separately as soloists under Blackmore's management. On 11 March 1964, Allen made his first solo TV appearance, on Graham Kennedy's In Melbourne Tonight. Later in that year, they both appeared on The Go!! Show and soon created a duo, Laurie Allen and Bobby Bright. They became regulars on The Go!! Show, alongside the Strangers, and were paid £ 50 per appearance.

As Bobby & Laurie, the duo issued the first single for Go!! Records, "I Belong with You", in August 1964. It was written by Laurie. The label was established in association with The Go!! Show. "I Belong with You" was produced by English-born producer, Roger Savage, who had arrived in Australia from London where he had worked with the Rolling Stones and Dusty Springfield. It reached number one on the local Melbourne charts for two weeks, and won Allen an Australian Record Award for Best Composition in 1965.

Bobby & Laurie worked with a backing band, the Rondells (previously the Lincolns and then the Silhouettes), which had an initial line-up of Bernie O'Brien on lead guitar, John Sullivan on rhythm guitar, Dennis Tucker on bass guitar and Dennis Collins on drums. The duo toured Australia, supported by a new line-up of the Rondells, with Sullivan joined by Roger Treble on lead guitar (ex-Silhouettes, Lincolns), Wayne Duncan on bass guitar (ex-Lincolns) and Gary Young on drums (ex-Silhouettes, Lincolns). Bobby & Laurie performed as Tweedledum and Tweedledee in a Christmas pantomime of Alice in Wonderland at Melbourne's Tivoli Theatre, in December 1964.

In early 1965 the pair appeared on TV music show, Teen Scene, on Australian Broadcasting Corporation (ABC), where they were dragged off the stage by screaming female fans. They appeared in the premiere episode of Channel 0's children's program, Magic Circle Club on 23 January, playing characters Twoddle and Boddle. They released three more singles on Go!! Records during 1965, "Someone" (which reached No. 3 in Melbourne), "Judy Green" and "Crazy Country Hop" (which reached No. 25). In May 1965 they supported a national tour by the Dave Clark Five, the Seekers and Tommy Quickly. Later that year they supported American, P. J. Proby on his national tour.

In 1966 the duo switched to the Albert Productions label, for the singles, "Sweet and Tender Romance" (February) and their version of Roger Miller's "Hitch Hiker" (March). which gave them a national number-one hit for five weeks in May and June. They also changed management from Blackmore to Mal Fisher. On the strength of "Hitch Hiker", the ABC gave them their own TV show, It's a Gas, which was later re-branded as, Dig We Must. The change was designed to attract a more sophisticated adult market, but lost the duo much of their teen appeal, which led to friction between the two artists. After recording their last album Exposaic, the pair officially split in early 1967 after three years together.

Solo careers

After the break-up, Allen continued performing as a soul revue act initially known as Dice, which was later renamed the Laurie Allen Revue. Bright worked in cabaret as well as acting. He appeared on TV police drama, Homicide. In 1968, he became a disc-jockey at Melbourne radio station 3XY.

Bobby & Laurie reunited on a radio program in February 1968 and returned to the charts with their cover version of the country music song, "The Carroll County Accident". It was followed by "Looking Through the Eyes of Love", but they split again by late 1971.

In 1973, Bright performed as the Doctor in the Melbourne stage production of Tommy. In the following years, the pair performed occasionally as Bobby & Laurie until their final Don't Let the Music Die concert on 1 June 2002 at the Kingston City Hall. On 13 June 2002, Allen died suddenly from a heart attack.

Discography

Singles

Albums

Bobby and Laurie – 1965
Hitch Hiker – 1966
Exposaic – 1966

See also

List of number-one singles in Australia during the 1960s

References

External links 

 https://web.archive.org/web/20070830113132/http://www.whiteroom.com.au/howlspace/en/bobbyandlaurie/bobbyandlaurie.htm
 https://web.archive.org/web/20070630190916/http://www.laurieallen.net/bobbyandlaurie
 Full discography

Australian male singers
Australian musical duos
Musical groups established in 1964